Maryam Jafarkhani Kermani is an Associate Professor in the Department of Tissue and Cell Culture at the Administration of Agriculture and Biotechnology Research Institute of Iran (ABRII). She is an Iranian scientist whose main research area is agricultural tissue culture and mainly studies plants in the Rosaceous family.

Kermani has served as the Head of Technology Transfer at ABRII for more than 5 years. She is an elected member of the board of Iranian Society for Ornamental Plants, a member of the board of directors of Iranian Society of Ornamental Plants (ISOP), a former editor in chief of the Iranian Journal of Ornamental Plants (IJOP), and the Coordinator of ECO Agricultural Biotechnology Network.

Education 
Kermani graduated with a Ph.D. in Bioscience, more specifically plant biotechnology, from the University of East London, UK, and completed a postdoctoral fellowship at King's College, London University, UK.

Scientific achievements 

    Production of four new varieties of roses: Two new tetraploids from diploid roses and three new hexaploids from triploid roses.
    Patent in Iran: A protocol for mass production of apple rootstocks.
    Patent in Iran: A protocol to induce chromosome doubling in plants.
    Patent in Iran: A protocol for mass production of 15 rose cultivars
    Publication of more than 30 research papers in the international Journals
    Publication of more than 10 research papers in the national Journals
    The protocol for mass production of apple rootstocks using tissue culture
    The protocol for micropropagation of large-fruit jujube-tree (Ziziphus jujuba)
    Completion of 30 Research Projects
    Supervising of more than 30 MSc and PhD students
    Holding and lecturing scientific of more than 10 workshops

Scientific achievements at pilot stage 
    Virus elimination and detection in apple rootstocks and cultivars

Awards 
    Receiving the award from the President of Iran in 2008
    Receiving the award from the Minister of Agriculture of Iran in 2010
    Title of top researcher of the Ministry of Agriculture of Iran in 2010

See also 

 List of King's College London alumni
 Theoretical and Applied Genetics
 Economic Cooperation Organization

References

In vitro radio-sensitivity of different genotypes and explants of rose (Rosa hybrida)

Agricultural Biotechnology Research Institute of Iran

Effect of Ploidy Level on the Nuclear Genome Content and Essential Oil Composition of Anise Hyssop

Micropropagation and medium-term conservation of Rosa pulverulenta

 کشت بافت توليد سيب را متحول مي‌کند (Jam-e Jam (newspaper))
 کشتِ بافت، توليد سيب را متحول مي‌کند
جوایز (Agricultural Biotechnology Research Institute of Iran)
 ايران در توليد انبوه انواع گل رز خودکفا شد، فناوری اکنون دیگر همه چیز از جمله گلها را نیز شامل شده و محقق ایرانی توانسته با دانش بیوتکنولوژی ، کشور را به خودکفایی تولید انبوه واریته گل رز برسانند
پژوهشگر نمونه وزارت كشاورزي معرفي و تقدير شد
مجله علمی ترویجی گل و گیاهان زینتی ایران
فهرست نشریات علمی دارای اعتبار Ministry of Science, Research and Technology (Iran)
دستیابی به رقم جدید رز با نام (ابری)
 شکوفایی رز ایرانی  [صادق دهقان]Iran (newspaper)

External links
ECOABN's Website

Year of birth missing (living people)
Living people
Iranian women scientists
Economic Cooperation Organization people